Taʻanga is a village on the island of ʻEua in Tonga. It is located on the western side of the island, just north of 'Ohonua. The population is 207.

References

Populated places in ʻEua